Lulu Reinhardt (17 August 1951 – 10 February 2014) (first name spelled Loulou on the first album on which he played) was a French gypsy jazz guitarist in the tradition of Django Reinhardt. He performed lead/joint lead guitar duties with the groups Romanesj, the Häns'che Weiss Quintett, the Titi Winterstein Quintet, and subsequently with Dodi Schumacher, Rigo Winterstein and Peter Petrel. He is considered an archetypal figure in the 1970s German gypsy jazz school.

Biography 
Reinhardt grew up in a Manouche community, first in his birthplace Forbach (a town in France on the French-German border), then in Verviers, Belgium. He received his first lessons from his father Noto, initially based on the style of Django Reinhardt. He made his first appearances at the age of twelve. From the early 1970s, the Reinhardt family resided in the Eifel area of Germany, near Euskirchen. His first recordings were made with the Ensemble Romanesj, with Haentsje and Bakro Rosenberg. In 1976 he became a member of the gypsy jazz Quintet of Häns'che Weiss and the following year took part in a tour with Weiss with Stéphane Grappelli. From 1978 he played in the quintet of Titi Winterstein. He formed a group with the saxophonist Dodi Schumacher and then headed a swingtett with Rigo Winterstein that was active for two decades and released several albums. Then he performed with Peter Petrel and his Gypsy Swingtett. Reinhardt also wrote a number of compositions such as "Lulu Swing", "Noto Swing" and "Valse à Madame" (with Rigo Winterstein). In the field of jazz he was involved in eleven recording sessions between 1975 and 1987.

In his obituary, Django Station describes Lulu Reinhardt with his technically virtuoso playing as the protagonist of the "German school" of gypsy jazz guitar, which is characterized by aggressive attack, rolling chords ("roulement d'accords"), rhythmic placement and virtuosity.

Lulu Reinhardt is not to be confused with Lulo Reinhardt (b. 1961).

Discography 
 Romanesj (with Bakaro Rosenberg & Häntsje Rosenberg): Amaro Djipe 2 - 1975
 Häns'che Weiss Quintett - Fünf Jahre Musik Deutscher Zigeuner - 1977
 Titi Winterstein Quintett: Saitenstraßen - 1978
 Titi Winterstein Quintett: I Raisa - 1980
 with Dodi Schumacher: Live 1980 - 1980 (presumed)
 Lulu Reinhardt-Dodi Schumacher Ensemble: Gypsy-Swing - 1982
 Titi Winterstein Quintett: Djinee Tu Kowa Ziro - 1985
 Titi Winterstein Quintett: Live Mit Vanessa & Sorba - 1987
 Titi Winterstein Quintett: Maro Djipen - 1994
 with Rigo Winterstein: King of the gypsies - 1997
 with Rigo Winterstein: Live Konzer Athen (date unknown)
 Titi Winterstein Quintett: Star portrait - 1999
 with Rigo Winterstein: Swing Legenden of Gibsy Jazz - 2007
 with Rigo Winterstein: Lulus Swing - 2012
 ?cassette, date not known: We Meet Again

Notes

External links 
 Entry for Lulu Reinhardt on German Wikipedia (translated version from July 2020 used as the basis for the initial version of this page)
 Lulu Reinhardt at Discogs.com

References 

1951 births
2014 deaths
French jazz guitarists
Gypsy jazz guitarists
Continental jazz guitarists
French male guitarists
20th-century guitarists
20th-century French musicians
20th-century French male musicians
French male jazz musicians